ROKS Soyang (AOE-51) is a fast combat support ship of the Republic of Korea Navy; she is named after the Soyang River.

Development and design 
On 7 September 2018, the Defense Acquisition Program Administration announced that Hyundai Heavy Industries had delivered Soyang to the Republic of Korea Navy.

The vessel is capable of embarking a helicopter on her helipad. She carriers a single Phalanx CIWS and MASS decoy launchers. She runs on both hybrid diesel and electric engines with two shafts.

Construction and career 
ROKS Soyang was laid down on 13 July 2015 and launched on 28 October 1996 by Hyundai Heavy Industries and commissioned on 18 September 2018.

Soyang sent three speed boats, masks and sanitizers for prevention of COVID-19 to the Philippines Navy ship during the exchange.

References

 

2016 ships
Auxiliary ships of the Republic of Korea Navy